Chris Pile may refer to:

 Chris Pile (footballer) (born 1967), former footballer
 Chris Pile (programmer) (born 1969), British computer programmer